Youli was a former settlement in ancient China. It was the location of King Zhou's imprisonment of the Zhou king Wen. It was during this captivity that he was said to have constructed the 64 hexagrams of the I Ching.

It is thought to have been located at the site of present-day Tangyin in Henan.

References

Shang dynasty